This is a list of seasons played by the football teams of South China Athletic Association in Hong Kong and Asian football, from 1916 (when South China first took part in the Hong Kong Football League) to the present day. It details the club's achievements in major competitions, and the top scorers for each season.

 
South China Aa